Hellinsia inquinatus is a moth of the family Pterophoridae. It is found in North America, including Florida, Mississippi, Oklahoma, Tennessee, Maryland, Alabama, Texas, Missouri, Colorado and Arizona. It has also been recorded from Hispaniola, Mexico, Puerto Rico and St. Thomas Island.

The head and thorax are gray, spotted with white. The abdomen is gray. The forewings are dust gray, thickly dusted with white and brown scales forming scattered flecks or blotches, one of which is generally present on the middle of the space between the base of the wing and the fissure. A larger one is found before the fissure and separated from it by a whitish space, below this is a longitudinal streak of scales, bordered basally by a white spot and separated from the spot before the fissure by a whitish space. Two blackish streaks or spots occur on the costa, the larger one above the base of fissure, the other halfway between it and the apex of the wing. The fringes are grayish, cut with white under the apices of the lobes and on the anal angles, where there is a white wisp. A similar wisp is found before the apex and on the anal angle of the second lobe. A brown dot sometimes rests on the base of each of the three wisps. The hindwings are brownish gray with a diffuse brown dot on the apex of each feather or at least on the first. Adults are on wing in April, June and December.

The larvae feed on Ambrosia artemissiifolia, Ambrosia trifida and Parthenium hysterophorus They feed externally on the young foliage of their host plant. They are pale greenish gray, with very characteristic dark markings and lateral tufts of long, white silken hairs. Pupation takes place in a pale fulvous pupa with a roseate hue.

References

inquinatus
Moths described in 1873
Moths of North America